Levan Khmaladze (born 6 April 1985) is Georgian football midfielder currently playing for Shukura Kobuleti.

Club career
He previously played for Chikhura Sachkhere in Georgia. A member of the Georgian national team, he signed for Hapoel Haifa on 18 January 2010.

Honours 
 Georgian League: 2
2008, 2013
 Georgian Cup: 2
2009, 2013
 Georgian Super Cup: 1
2008

References

External links 
  Player profile at Dinamo's official web-site
 
 

1985 births
Footballers from Tbilisi
Living people
Footballers from Georgia (country)
Association football midfielders
Georgia (country) youth international footballers
Georgia (country) international footballers
FC Dinamo Tbilisi players
FC Dinamo Batumi players
FC Sioni Bolnisi players
Hapoel Haifa F.C. players
FC Chikhura Sachkhere players
Othellos Athienou F.C. players
Pafos FC players
ENTHOI Lakatamia FC players
FC Shukura Kobuleti players
Erovnuli Liga players
Israeli Premier League players
Cypriot First Division players
Cypriot Second Division players
Expatriate footballers from Georgia (country)
Expatriate footballers in Israel
Expatriate footballers in Cyprus
Expatriate sportspeople from Georgia (country) in Israel
Expatriate sportspeople from Georgia (country) in Cyprus